Koubia (Pular: 𞤍𞤢𞤤𞤭𞥅𞤪𞤫 𞤑𞤵𞤦𞤭𞤴𞤢𞥄) is a prefecture located in the Labé Region of Guinea in the Fouta Djallon mountains. Fulas are the majority ethnic group in the region with Fula (Pular) as the primary language.  The capital is Koubia. The prefecture covers an area of 2,800 km.² and has an estimated population of 114,000.

Sub-prefectures
The prefecture is divided administratively into 6 sub-prefectures:
 Koubia-Centre
 Fafaya
 Gadha-Woundou
 Matakaou
 Missira
 Pilimini

Prefectures of Guinea
Labé Region